Norclostebol acetate (brand name Anabol 4-19), or norchlorotestosterone acetate (NClTA), also known as 4-chloro-19-nortestosterone 17β-acetate or as  4-chloroestr-4-en-17β-ol-3-one, is a synthetic, injectable anabolic-androgenic steroid (AAS) and derivative of 19-nortestosterone (nandrolone). It is an androgen ester – specifically, the C17β acetate ester of norclostebol (4-chloro-19-nortestosterone).

See also
 Clostebol
 Clostebol acetate
 Clostebol caproate
 Clostebol propionate
 Oxabolone
 Oxabolone cipionate

References

Acetate esters
Androgen esters
Androgens and anabolic steroids
Estranes
Organochlorides
Prodrugs
World Anti-Doping Agency prohibited substances